The 50th World Science Fiction Convention (Worldcon), also known as MagiCon, was held on 3–7 September 1992 at the Clarion Hotel, The Peabody Orlando, and the Orange County Convention Center in Orlando, Florida, United States.

The chairman was Joe Siclari. The vice-chairman was Becky Thomson.

Participants 

Attendance was 5,319, out of 6,368 paid memberships.

Guests of Honor 

 Jack Vance (pro)
 Vincent Di Fate (artist)
 Walter A. Willis (fan)
 Spider Robinson (toastmaster)
 Mike Resnick (oastmaster for the Meet-the-Pros party)

Awards

1992 Hugo Awards 

The 1992 Hugo Award base included a black stone backdrop featuring an astronomical scene hand-painted by base designer Phil Tortoricci. The base included orange grating from Cape Canaveral's Pad 29, launch site of America's first successful space satellite, Explorer I.

 Best Novel: Barrayar by Lois McMaster Bujold
 Best Novella: "Beggars in Spain" by Nancy Kress
 Best Novelette: "Gold" by Isaac Asimov
 Best Short Story: "A Walk in the Sun" by Geoffrey A. Landis
 Best Non-Fiction Book: The World of Charles Addams by Charles Addams
 Best Dramatic Presentation: Terminator 2: Judgment Day
 Best Professional Editor: Gardner Dozois
 Best Professional Artist: Michael Whelan
 Best Original Artwork: cover of The Summer Queen by Michael Whelan
 Best Semiprozine: Locus, edited by Charles N. Brown
 Best Fanzine: Mimosa, edited by Dick Lynch & Nicki Lynch
 Best Fan Writer: Dave Langford
 Best Fan Artist: Brad W. Foster

Other awards 

 John W. Campbell Award for Best New Writer: Ted Chiang

See also 

 Hugo Award
 Science fiction
 Speculative fiction
 World Science Fiction Society
 Worldcon

References

External links 

 NESFA.org: The Long List
 NESFA.org: 1992 convention notes 

1992 conferences
1992 in Florida
1992 in the United States
Events in Orlando, Florida
Science fiction conventions in the United States
Worldcon